Mark Fredriksen (18 November 1936 – 25 August 2011) was a French extreme right figure and the founder, in 1966, of the neo-Nazi Fédération d'action nationaliste et européenne.

Biography 
Fredriksen co-edited Notre Europe, which was the mouthpiece of the Revolutionary Nationalist Groups (GNR), a Third Position group headed by François Duprat, who later joined the National Front (FN).

He also stood as a candidate for the National Front (FN) at a time when the party sought out alliances with more radical groups due to the impact on their support that the Parti des forces nouvelles (PFN) was having. Fredriksen was a strong critic of the PFN, arguing that they were just a more militant version of mainstream Gaullism. As such Fredriksen was the FN candidate in Seine-Saint-Denis in the 1978 election where his 1.4% vote share was actually one of the higher results for the far right in an election in which they failed to prosper. Fredriksen left the FN after the murder of François Duprat, feeling that Jean-Marie Le Pen was too 'soft' for his liking.

Fredriksen's controversial opinions made him a target for direct attacks more than once. On September 19, 1980 Fredriksen and a group of his supporters were attacked at the Paris palace of justice by a group of people claiming to represent the Jewish Defense Organization. Fredriksen suffered a further attack on October 12 of that same year and had to be hospitalized. He died on 25 August 2011.

Bibliography

References

1936 births
2011 deaths
French neo-Nazis
National Rally (France) politicians
Neo-Nazi politicians